Emily Perry may refer to:

 Emily Perry (Australian actress) (born 1981), Australian soap opera actor
 Emily Perry (English actress) (1907–2008), English actress and dancer
 Emily Austin Perry (1795–1851), early settler of Texas and sole heir to Stephen F. Austin
 Emily Perry (politician), Kansas Democrat